Multishow Ao Vivo: Dois Quartos is the seventh album by Brazilian singer, songwriter, arranger, producer Ana Carolina.

Background 

Recorded at the Credicard Hall in São Paulo, November 24 and 25, 2007, for the project Multishow Ao Vivo, the show gathers songs consecrated as "Pra Rua Me Levar", "Encostar Na Tua", "Quem de Nós Dois", "Confesso" e "É Isso Aí"; successes studio double album "Dois Quartos", Like "Cantinho", "Eu Comi a Madona", "Carvão", "Nada Te Faltará", "O Cristo de Madeira" and "Rosas", two new songs: "Eu Que Não Sei Quase Nada do Mar" (written in partnership with Jorge Vercilo, recorded by Maria Bethânia), "Cabide" (recorded by Mart'nália) and rewriting "Três" of Marina Lima.

The original design provided for three of the album shows, performed at days 23, 24 and November 25, 2007.  The first show was not recorded.  In the last show, in turn, Throating song and a remix of roses were not included in the album.

The DVD features such as bonus material, an interview with the singer (Ana Carolina), the making-of the show and comments from Anna on the tracks. It sold 100 000 in Brazil, being certified platinum.

Track List

DVD
 Cantinho / Fever / Eu sou melhor que você
 Eu comi a Madona
 Rosas
 Tolerância
 Carvão
 Eu que não sei quase nada do mar
 Confesso / Trancado / Nua / Pra rua me levar / Encostar na tua
 Nada te faltará
 O Cristo de madeira
 Texto / É isso aí (The Blower's Daughter)
 Ruas de outono
 Aqui
 Quem de nós dois (La Mia Storia Tra Le Dita)
 Três
 Manhã / Sinais de fogo
 Um edifício no meio do mundo
 Milhares de sambas
 Cabide
 Chevette
 1.100,00 (Nega marrenta)
 Notícias populares
 Uma louca tempestade
 Elevador (Livro de esquecimento)
 Eu comi a Madona (Remix) (featuring DJ Zé Pedro)
 Vai (Faixa bônus)

Extras
 Comentários de Ana Carolina sobre as canções
 Making Of
 Ana Fala (entrevista com Ana Carolina)

CD
 Cantinho / Fever / Eu Sou Melhor Que Você
 Eu comi a Madona
 Rosas
 Tolerância
 Carvão
 Eu que não sei quase nada do mar
 Nada te faltará
 O Cristo de madeira
 Texto / É isso aí (The blower's daughter)
 Ruas de outono
 Aqui / Quem de nós dois (La mia storia tra le dita)
 Milhares de sambas
 Cabide
 Um edifício no meio do mundo
 Vai

Singles
 Vai
 Tolerância

Charts

Year-end charts

Certifications

Album

DVD

References

2008 live albums
2008 video albums
Live video albums
Ana Carolina albums